Éric Prodon was the defending champion, but lost in the semifinals to Wayne Odesnik.

Odesnik then went on to win the title, defeating Adrian Ungur in the final 6–1, 7–6(7–4).

Seeds

Draw

Finals

Top half

Bottom half

References
 Main Draw
 Qualifying Draw

Seguros Bolivar Open Bucaramanga - Singles
2012 Singles